RTÉ Gold is an Irish radio station broadcasting on Saorview, online, and Virgin Media. RTE Gold is also available on Eir TV (eirtv /eir vision) eir

Background
The station plays music from the 1950s to the 2000s.

Weekday programming has presenter led programmes from 7am - 2pm. At weekends there is a full presenter led schedule from 8am to 8pm.

On 6 November 2017, presented weekday breakfast and drivetime programmes were introduced, hosted by RTÉ radio presenters Will Leahy and Rick O'Shea.

On 6 November 2019, RTÉ management announced that, as part of a major cost-saving programme, all its digital radio stations would be closed, including RTÉ Gold. In March 2021, it was announced that the station would remain on air via Saorview, cable and online streaming, but the DAB network would close at the end of the month.

References

External links
 Listen to RTÉ Gold on RTÉ Player 
RTÉ digital radio service to begin, The Irish Times, 20 November 2008

Adult contemporary radio stations in Ireland
Classic hits radio stations
Digital-only radio stations
Gold